This page provides supplementary chemical data on hydrogen iodide.

Structure and properties

Thermodynamic properties

Spectral data

Material Safety Data Sheet  

The handling of this chemical may incur notable safety precautions. It is highly recommend that you seek the Material Safety Datasheet (MSDS) for this chemical from a reliable source  such as SIRI, and follow its directions.
 hydrogen iodide MSDS

References

Chemical data pages
Chemical data pages cleanup